"Infinity Countdown" is a 2018 comic book storyline published by Marvel Comics. The storyline leads into the "Infinity Wars" storyline.

Premise
The story depicts the Ultron/Hank Pym going after the Infinity Gems that were recreated when the Multiverse was restored.

Plot

Prologue
Back during the Time Runs Out storyline, the Infinity Gems were destroyed during the Incursion that affected the Multiverse. When the Multiverse is restored by Mister Fantastic, it enabled the Infinity Gems to be restored. When the Space Gem was the first to manifest, it was targeted by the Frost Giant Snarr on Loki's behalf. He was killed by a somehow-revived Wolverine who claimed the Space Gem.

The Mind Gem was later found by Turk Barrett who used it for his own personal gain.

A giant-sized version of the Power Gem appeared on the desert planet Xitaung. After its discovery, the Guardians of the Galaxy and the Nova Corps work together to guard it.

Captain Marvel later found the Reality Gem in an adjacent unidentified reality.

It was discovered that the Time Gem restored the planet Sakaar. While Amadeus Cho's Hulk form was fighting the Warlord, the Time Gem was unearthed by Super-Skrull who planned to use it to restore the Skrull Empire to its former glory.

Main plot
At some point in the past, Loki, who wanted to know about the Soul Gem's location, visited Gardener. When Gardener didn't know where it was, Loki infected him with a poison that drove him mad to the point where he shattered Groot and took some of his splinters to grow an army of Flora Colossi. In the present, Gardener and his army of Flora Colossi are attacking Telferina. The Guardians of the Galaxy intercepted the army of Flora Colossi where it was revealed that Groot regenerated from a splinter and couldn't reach his normal size due to Gardener having taken all his splinters. Getting close to Gardener, Groot used his energy to cure Gardener of the poison. After being healed, Gardener's first action was to restore Groot to his original height as well as allowing him to speak in full sentences in the third person. A building-sized Flora Colossus named Scar was, however, still on a rampage. Meanwhile, Warbringer led the Chitauri fleet to the planet Xitaung in order to claim the Power Stone. In Madripoor, the Black Widow clone had traced a dead drop signal left by Wolverine. She found that Wolverine secretly left the Space Infinity Gem in her care.

The Guardians of the Galaxy managed to defeat Scar and join the Nova Corps in their fight against the Fraternity of Raptors and the Chitauri on Xituang. Meanwhile, Adam Warlock starts looking for the Soul Gem which brings him to the planet Saiph. Upon arriving, he finds that the planet has been conquered by the Ultron/Hank Pym and one of his infected victims is Silver Surfer.

After the Nova Corps decided to retreat from battle, Nova secretly thanked Robbie upon figuring out that someone could alter the size of the Power Gem. Using this revelation, Star-Lord shrunk it to the size of his hand. However, it was discovered that the Power Gem was an anchor for Xituang as it starts to crumble. The Guardians of the Galaxy and the Nova Corps use the Power Stone to destroy the Chitauri fleet as they escape from the doomed planet. Meanwhile, Adam Warlock heals Silver Surfer of the Ultron Virus. As the Ultron/Hank Pym is using Saiph as his base of operations and plans to unleash the Ultron Virus on a cosmic scale, Silver Surfer goes to look for Galactus. Even though Galactus is no longer a world-eater, Silver Surfer informs him of what is happening and asks for his help to stop the Ultron/Hank Pym's plot. However, the Ultron/Hank Pym had already launched rockets filled with the Ultron Virus in order to infect the entire galaxy while saving Earth as his last target.

Galactus initially refuses to consume Saiph due to the consequences of destroying it until he agrees with Silver Surfer. This results in Saiph and the rockets transporting the Ultron Virus being destroyed. The Ultron/Hank Pym got wounded in the escape and Adam Warlock claims the Soul Gem. Due to Galactus' hunger returning, Silver Surfer had to take him to an uninhabited planet to satisfy it. After the Guardians of the Galaxy and the Nova Corps regroup on Knowhere, Drax the Destroyer makes off with the Power Stone while Nova plans to rescue his brother from the Fraternity of Raptors. Star-Lord is summoned by Collector and Grandmaster who have with them a Reality Gem from another reality. The Phyla-Vell from an alternate reality where she operated as Captain Marvel appeared to retrieve it. Star-Lord gives the Reality Gem to her without a fight since it won't work outside her reality.

As the Guardians of the Galaxy escape to Oblitus, they are intercepted by Adam Warlock and Kang the Conqueror. Gamora attempted to take the Soul Gem from Adam Warlock. When Drax the Destroyer held onto the Soul Gem, he discovered that the Soul World inside is corrupted. Drax knocked out Gamora and made off with Adam Warlock and Kang the Conqueror. As the rest of the Guardians of the Galaxy don't want to help Gamora pursue Adam Warlock and Kang the Conqueror, she went off on her own. Doctor Strange tracks down the Mind Gem and finds it in Turk Barrett's possession as Turk managed to evade him. When Black Widow's clone arrives seeking out Doctor Strange where she wants to dispose of the Space Stone, he did not want to take it as he knows what would happen if they are in the same proximity. Using a magic spell, Doctor Strange spoke to the holders of the Infinity Gems and requested a parley to reform the Infinity Watch. He states to Adam Warlock, Black Widow's clone, Captain Marvel, Star-Lord, and Turk Barrett that they need to safeguard them from such calamities even if one of them is Thanos.

Tie-in
After getting some information from the Contemplator's severed head, Magus found the Soul Gem on the surface of Ego the Living Planet. Before he can make plans to gather the other Infinity Gems and reshape the universe in his image, Magus is supposedly killed by the Ultron/Hank Pym who claimed the Soul Gem. After sending out some aliens that he infected with the Ultron Virus, the Ultron/Hank Pym learned that the ones that were sent after Wolverine were killed by him. Unbeknownst to the Ultron/Hank Pym, a soul fragment of Hank Pym entered the Soul Stone's Soul World where he encountered an elderly version of Gamora. Hank Pym's soul was told by the soul fragment of an elderly Gamora that he was going to be trapped here forever. As for Wolverine following his victory, he was approached by Loki, who warns him of an upcoming war where many villains will be coming after him and those who have the Infinity Gems.

As he now has the knowledge of the calamity that would come if the Infinity Gems were gathered in the same location again, Kang the Conqueror abducts Adam Warlock and convinces him to help secure the Soul Gem in exchange for the Time Gem. Adam is then sent back in time to receive counsel from Kang the Conqueror's Rama-Tut counterpart.

While doing a ride-sharing scam as he is driving through Greenwich Village, Turk Barrett stumbled upon a bunch of Skrulls attacking some monks that were delivering the Mind Infinity Gem to Doctor Strange at the Sanctum Sanctorum. Upon acquiring the Mind Gem during the fight, Turk Barrett begins to establish a criminal empire so that he can fill the void that was left when Kingpin left the criminal business. After briefly confronting Turk, Daredevil finds that he somehow can see again when in his presence. Turk uses the Mind Gem to get the judges to change their verdict on some criminals while gaining their loyalty and money. Daredevil caught wind of Turk Barrett's goals and warned him about playing in the criminal big leagues.

While on a mission in outer space, Doctor Strange discovers that Super-Skrull has the Time Infinity Gem. After a battle with Super-Skrull, Doctor Strange claims the Time Gem.

Issues involved

Main plot
 Infinity Countdown #1-5

Tie-ins
 Infinity Countdown: Adam Warlock #1
 Infinity Countdown: Black Widow #1
 Infinity Countdown: Captain Marvel #1
 Infinity Countdown: Champions #1-2
 Infinity Countdown: Daredevil #1
 Infinity Countdown: Darkhawk #1-4
 Infinity Countdown: Prime #1

Involved but not listed under the "Infinity Countdown" banner
 Doctor Strange #1-3  sees Doctor Strange traveling through space and acquire the Time Stone from the Super Skrull. Incidentally issue #3 is actually a tie-in to Infinity Wars.

Sequel
A sequel series titled Infinity Wars was released in 2018.

Collected editions

References

2018 comics debuts
Comics set on fictional planets